Passiflora picturata is a species of passion flower in the family Passifloraceae.

picturata